Vaillancourt (Valencourt) is a surname of French origin, most commonly found in the province of Quebec, Canada.

Brief family history
Spelling variations of the name include: Vaillant, Vailant, Vailland, Vailand, Le Vailland, Levailland, LeVaillant, Le Vaillant, Levaillant, Vaillancourt, Vaincourt, and Valencourt.

The Vaillancourt name originates from the Northern French regions of Lorraine and Normandy. Ancestors of the family were seated at Gulis, and were important members of the aristocracy of the region.

The origin of the Vaillancourt name can be traced back to the early 13th century in Normandy, France. In 1220, an abbey was built on land belonging to Guillaume D'Abberville on his property at Thum. The abbey was given the name "de Villencourt" in reference to the court of Count William of Ponthieu, held there from 1105 to 1126 A.D. In 1195, D'Abberville married Alice of France, the daughter of Louis VII, King of France. The new marriage gave his court considerable clout; however D'Abberville died within a year of the founding of the abbey. His heirs would eventually produce two kings of England: Edward I and Edward II. The seat of the abbey was moved in 1662 to Abbeville, the capital of Ponthieu, for greater safety during the French Wars of Religion.

The name is Anglicized as Smart. 
 Robert Vaillancourt of Normandy, France, settled in Île d'Orléans, Quebec in 1666. He is thought to be one of the first with the family name to settle in the New World. Louis-Marie Valiant, another settler of North America, was part of an early wave of French settlers that arrived in Louisiana in 1714.

Motto
Je ne change point, which translates into English as: "I don't change my mind."

Notable Vaillancourts
 Brian Vaillancourt American Chef and Seafood Expert. Born 1971
 Annette M. Vaillancourt, Ph.D., American Author
 Armand Vaillancourt, a Québécois sculptor, painter and performance artist
 Audrey Vaillancourt, Canadian biathlete
 Chris G. Vaillancourt, Canadian artist and poet
 Claude Vaillancourt, Canadian lawyer, judge and politician
 Cory Vaillancout, American author
 Cyrille Vaillancourt, Canadian businessman and politician
 Cyrille Émile Vaillancourt, Canadian physician and politician
 François Vaillancourt, Montreal-based Canadian painter
 Gilles Vaillancourt, mayor of the city of Laval, Quebec, Canada in 1989
 Henri Vaillancourt, subject of John McPhee's "The Survival of the Bark Canoe"
 Judith Vaillancourt, co-founder and designer of Vaillancourt Folk Art
 Michel Vaillancourt, Canadian show jumper
 Pamela R. Vaillancourt, American food scientist and IFT Fellow
 Paul Vaillancourt, Ontario's Strongest Man champion in 2009-11 & 2016
 Rita Vaillancourt, (1926-2002), French Canadian Extraordinary Mother
 Robert D. Vaillancourt, American oceanographer and educator
 Sarah Vaillancourt, Canadian Olympics women's ice hockey player
 Steve Vaillancourt (1951-2017), American politician
Dale Vaillancourt,Co founder and owner of Divine Swine Catering, Lakeville, Minnesota

References

French-language surnames